The Otter River is a  river in Houghton County, Michigan, in the United States. It was home to the last known population of Michigan Grayling. No grayling have been seen or caught in the river since 1938.

See also
List of rivers of Michigan

References

Michigan  Streamflow Data from the USGS

Rivers of Michigan
Rivers of Houghton County, Michigan